Cecil Randolph "Squiz" Pillion (April 13, 1894 – September 30, 1962) was a Major League Baseball pitcher.

Sources

Major League Baseball pitchers
Philadelphia Athletics players
Raleigh Capitals players
Baseball players from Hartford, Connecticut
1894 births
1962 deaths
Burials at Homewood Cemetery